Charles Pinckney Jones (September 17, 1845 – February 22, 1914) was an American soldier and politician.

Jones was born in Pendleton County. He enlisted in the Confederate States Army. He served as a Private in the 18th Virginia Cavalry; and according to the Fort Stevens Confederate order of battle the unit was assigned to Imboden's and W.L. Jackson's Brigade participating in the Gettysburg Campaign, skirmishing the Federals in western Virginia. Later the cavalry served in the Shenandoah Valley before disbanding in April, 1865. He attended the University of Virginia Law School graduating with distinction in 1868. He established a law practice in Monterey, Virginia. On January 17, 1872, he married Martha Jane Wilson, great-great-great granddaughter of Colonel John Wilson, a longtime member of the Virginia House of Burgesses until his death in 1773.

Jones was elected to the  Virginia House of Delegates in 1883. In 1885 he was elected to the  Virginia State Senate, serving the counties of Highland, Bath and Alleghany until 1897. From 1898 to 1906, he was a member of the Board of Visitors of the University of Virginia and in that first year was elected by the board to be the Rector of the University. He was the last Rector to serve the university before they adopted the presidential system for the school. The first president of the University, Edwin A. Alderman, was informally installed as President September 15, 1904. Charles P. Jones formally inducted the new president at a ceremony on Thomas Jefferson's birthday anniversary, April 13, 1905.  He died in Monterey, Virginia.

The C.P. Jones House and Law Office at Monterey was listed on the National Register of Historic Places in 2013.

References

1845 births
1914 deaths
Confederate States Army soldiers
Members of the Virginia House of Delegates
People from Highland County, Virginia
People of Virginia in the American Civil War
University of Virginia School of Law alumni
Virginia lawyers
Virginia state senators
19th-century American politicians
People from Pendleton County, West Virginia
19th-century American lawyers
20th-century American lawyers